"Real Love" is a song by American singer Jody Watley from her second studio album, Larger Than Life (1989). The single reached the number-one spot on the US Billboard Hot Black Singles and Dance Club Play charts. On the US Billboard Hot 100, "Real Love" peaked at number two for two weeks in May 1989. The song was also nominated for a Soul Train Music Award for Best Female Single.

Music video
The music video premiered in March 1989. During mid-1989, Watley's "Real Love" video, directed by David Fincher, was nominated for six MTV Video Music Awards including Breakthrough Video, Best Art Direction, Best Dance Video, and Best Female Video at the 1989 award show. That record was held until Michael Jackson's and Janet Jackson's "Scream" received eleven VMA nominations in 1995.

Awards and nominations

Charts

Weekly charts

Year-end charts

Certifications

Release history

References

Jody Watley songs
1989 singles
1989 songs
Cashbox number-one singles
MCA Records singles
Music videos directed by David Fincher
Songs written by André Cymone
Songs written by Jody Watley